The women's 400 metres hurdles event at the 2010 World Junior Championships in Athletics was held in Moncton, New Brunswick, Canada, at Moncton Stadium on 22 and 24 July.

Medalists

Results

Final
24 July

Heats
22 July

Heat 1

Heat 2

Heat 3

Participation
According to an unofficial count, 22 athletes from 19 countries participated in the event.

References

400 metres hurdles
400 metres hurdles at the World Athletics U20 Championships
2010 in women's athletics